Erich Schmitt (6 August 1912 – 29 October 1979) was a Swiss field handball player who competed in the 1936 Summer Olympics.

He was part of the Suisse field handball team, which won the bronze medal. He played all five matches.

References

1912 births
1979 deaths
Swiss male handball players
Olympic handball players of Switzerland
Field handball players at the 1936 Summer Olympics
Olympic bronze medalists for Switzerland
Olympic medalists in handball
Medalists at the 1936 Summer Olympics